Gianni Widmer (April 25, 1892 in Trieste, then in Austro-Hungarian Empire – October 30, 1971 in Milan, Italy) (Slovenian: Ivan Vidmar, German: Johann Widmer) was an Italian civil and military aviator of Slovenian descent, a pioneer of airmail.

He was interred at the cemetery of S. Anna in Trieste.

Noted achievements

On September 24, 1911 he flew from Venice to Trieste across the Adriatic Sea in 1h 15 min.

There is a monument to Gianni Widmer in San Marino on the mountain of Monte Carlo (Fiorentino commune) to commemorate his landing there on April 16, 1913. It was authored by sculptor Carlo Reffi, inscription by Pietro Franciosi. It is the second monument to an aviator (the first one being to Alberto Santos-Dumont in Paris, France). He was also awarded the San Marino Gold Medal of Civil Merit of first class for this feat.

References

1892 births
1971 deaths
Italian aviators
Slovenian aviators
Italian people of Slovene descent
Military personnel from Trieste